The Grand, formerly the Grand Hotel and Spa, is a Grade II* listed hotel in York, England, the city's only 5-star hotel. Opened in May 2010 and renovated and extended in 2017–18, it is an Edwardian building dating to 1906, originally the headquarters of the North Eastern Railway, with views of the York city walls and York Minster. It is owned by Splendid Hospitality Group.

History

The Grand's building opened in 1906 as the headquarters of the North Eastern Railway (then one of the richest businesses in Britain); The NER's architect William Bell produced the basic structural design and commissioned architect Horace Field worked on the external and internal design. It is believed their design won a silver medal at an exhibition in Paris in 1904. Construction took place between 1900 and 1906.

The hotel opened in 2010 as the Cedar Court Grand Hotel & Spa, after the building was purchased in 2007 and refurbished by Cedar Court Group. Splendid Hospitality Group bought it in 2014  and in 2017–2018 refurbished and expanded it.

Facilities

The hotel opened with 107 rooms (13 suites), a spa, two restaurants (The Rise, and the 3 AA-rosette Hudsons), and business meeting facilities for up to 120 people. In the 2010s expansion, the number of rooms was increased to 207 and the White Rose Lounge was added.

The boardroom won the "best boardroom/small meeting room" award at the 2017 Conference Hospitality Awards.

Management
The general manager is Simon Mahon.

References

External links

 Official website

Buildings and structures completed in 1906
Grade II* listed buildings in York
Hotel spas
Hotels in York